Billy Crystal is an American standup up comedian, actor, writer, and director. 

He has received numerous awards for his work including five Primetime Emmy Awards, a Tony Award, and a Drama Desk Award. He has also received multiple Golden Globe Award and Grammy Award nominations. Crystal won his first Primetime Emmy Award in 1989 for his hosting abilities of the 31st Grammy Awards. He won his second Emmy in 1991 for hosting, and writing the material at the 63rd Academy Awards. He received two Grammy Award nominations for his comedy album, You Look Marvelous in 1987, and his Spoken Word Album, Still Foolin' Em in 2013. For his on television, Crystal has received several awards and nominations. Among them are 21 Emmy Award nominations, with six wins. 

He won a Tony Award, and Drama Desk Award for his one man performance play, 700 Sundays in 2005. In 1991, Crystal was honored by being given a star on the Hollywood Walk of Fame. In 2007, Crystal received the Mark Twain Prize for American Humor where he was honored by his friends Robin Williams, Whoopi Goldberg, Rob Reiner, Robert DeNiro, Danny DeVito, John Goodman, Jon Lovitz, Jimmy Fallon, Martin Short, Bob Costas and Barbara Walters at the Kennedy Center.

Major Awards

Emmy Awards

Grammy Awards

Tony Awards

Industry awards

Drama Desk Awards

Outer Critics Circle Awards

Golden Globe Awards

Directors Guild of America Award

Special Honors

Miscellaneous Awards

CableACE Awards

American Comedy Awards

Television Critics Association

Other Awards

References 

Crystal, Billy, list of awards and nominations received by
Crystal, Billy, list of awards and nominations received by
Awards